Daniel Rodriguez, also known as Dani Rodriguez is a Swiss-Dominican Muay Thai fighter. He is the current Rajadamnern Stadium Light Middleweight champion.

Muay Thai career

In 2019 Rodriguez traveled to Thailand to train at the Sitchefboontham camp. There he fought three times, winning all his bouts by knockout at the Rajadamnern Stadium.

On August 21, 2021, Rodriguez faced Valentin Thibaut for WBC Muay Thai European title at the event Fight Time in Switzerland. He won the fight by decision to capture the belt.

On June 1, 2022, Rodriguez faced Saenpon Petchphachara for the vacant Rajadamnern Stadium 154 lbs title. He won the fight by decision and became the 13th non thai fighter in history to hold a Rajadamnern Stadium belt.

On September 9, 2022, Rodriguez faced top fighter Yodwicha Por Boonsit in the second round of the Rajadamnern World Series. He created the upset when he won the fight by split decision. Following this success, Rodriguez was ranked as the #1 Muay Thai fighter in the world at 154 lbs by both the World Muaythai Organization and the WBC Muay Thai.

Titles
Rajadamnern Stadium
 2022 Rajadamnern Stadium 154 lbs Champion
 2022 Rajadamnern World Series 154 lbs Winner and RWS Best Fighter Award

World Boxing Council Muay Thai
 2016 WBC Muay Thai Swiss -63.5 kg Champion
 2021 WBC Muay Thai European 154 lbs Champion

Fight record

|- style="background:#cfc" 
| 2022-12-23 || Win ||align="left" | Yodwicha Por Boonsit || Rajadamnern World Series - Final|| Bangkok, Thailand || Decision (Split) || 5 || 3:00
|-
! style=background:white colspan=9 |

|- style="background:#cfc" 
| 2022-11-18 || Win ||align="left" | Satanfah Sitsongpeenong || Rajadamnern World Series - Semi Final|| Bangkok, Thailand || TKO (Punches) ||  1||2:45

|- style="background:#cfc" 
| 2022-10-14 || Win ||align="left" | Parham Gheirati || Rajadamnern World Series - Group Stage|| Bangkok, Thailand || TKO (Doctor stoppage) || 3 ||

|- style="background:#cfc" 
| 2022-09-09 || Win ||align="left" | Yodwicha Por Boonsit || Rajadamnern World Series - Group Stage|| Bangkok, Thailand || Decision (Split) ||3  ||3:00

|- style="background:#cfc" 
| 2022-08-05 || Win ||align="left" | Rungrat Pumpanmuang|| Rajadamnern World Series - Group Stage || Bangkok, Thailand || KO (Punches) ||2  || 1:05

|- style="background:#cfc" 
| 2022-06-01 || Win ||align="left" | Saenpon Petchphachara || Muay Thai Palangmai, Rajadamnern Stadium || Bangkok, Thailand || Decision ||  5 || 3:00
|-
! style=background:white colspan=9 |

|- style="background:#cfc" 
| 2022-04-27 || Win ||align="left" | Domenico Naswetter || Sor.Sommai, Rajadamnern Stadium || Bangkok, Thailand || KO || 2 ||

|- style="background:#cfc" 
| 2022-03-30 || Win ||align="left" | Palangnum PhuketAirport || Sor.Sommai, Rajadamnern Stadium || Bangkok, Thailand || TKO (Flying knee + punch) || 3 ||

|- style="background:#cfc" 
| 2021-12-18 || Win ||align="left" | Brahim Akrour ||  Zurcher Kampfnacht || Zurich, Switzerland || KO (Middle kick + body punches)|| 1 ||

|- style="background:#cfc" 
| 2021-08-21 || Win ||align="left" | Valentin Thibaut || Fight Time X || Recherswil, Switzerland || Decision (Unanimous) || 5 ||3:00 
|-
! style=background:white colspan=9 |

|- style="background:#cfc" 
| 2020-08-22 || Win ||align="left" | Mathieu Tavares || Fight Time || Recherswil, Switzerland || Decision  || 5 ||3:00

|-  style="background:#cfc;"
| 2020-02-01 || Win ||align=left| Sabri Sadouki || GVA Fight Night 2 || Geneva, Switzerland || KO (High kick) || 2 ||

|-  style="background:#cfc;"
| 2019-06-29 || Win ||align=left| Florian Bréau || Fight Time || Zurich, Switzerland || TKO || 2 ||

|- style="background:#cfc" 
| 2019-04-28 || Win ||align="left" | Yodkhunsuk Muangsima || Chujaroen, Rajadamnern Stadium || Bangkok, Thailand || TKO (Low kicks) || 2 ||

|- style="background:#cfc" 
| 2019-04-01 || Win ||align="left" | Mike Sor.Poolsawat || Chujaroen, Rajadamnern Stadium || Bangkok, Thailand || KO (Spinning elbow) || 4 ||

|- style="background:#cfc" 
| 2019-03-06 || Win ||align="left" | Amery Chuwattana || Chujaroen, Rajadamnern Stadium || Bangkok, Thailand || KO || 1 ||

|-  style="background:#cfc;"
| 2018-11-03 || Win ||align=left| Bruno Pineiro || Superfight 13 || Zurich, Switzerland || Decision || 3 || 3:00

|-  style="background:#cfc;"
| 2017-12-08 || Win ||align=left| Rit Kaewsamrit || Fight Night || Dietikon, Switzerland || Decision || 3 || 3:00

|-  style="background:#cfc;"
| 2017-09-30 || Win ||align=left| Thibaut Arias || Zurcher Kampfnacht|| Zurich, Switzerland || TKO (Doctor stoppage)|| 1 ||

|-  style="background:#cfc;"
| 2017-01-07 || Win ||align=left| Ruslan Toktharov || Fight Time VI|| Recherswil, Switzerland || Decision || 3 || 3:00

|-  style="background:#cfc;"
| 2016-07-09 || Win ||align=left| Antonin Marconi ||  Fight Time V	|| Recherswil, Switzerland || TKO (Doctor stoppage)|| 2 ||

|-  style="background:#cfc;"
| 2016-02-27 || Win ||align=left| Guillaume Pascal || Road to Bangkok IV|| Cernier, Switzerland || Decision || 3 || 3:00

|- style="background:#cfc" 
| 2015-12-05 || Win ||align="left" | Alexander Epp || Swiss Las Vegas, Final  || Spreitenbach, Switzerland || KO || 1 ||

|- style="background:#cfc" 
| 2015-12-05 || Win ||align="left" | Dennis Haddad || Swiss Las Vegas, Semi Final  || Spreitenbach, Switzerland || Decision || 3 || 3:00

|- style="background:#cfc" 
| 2015-11-07 || Win ||align="left" | Guillaume Galster ||  Muaythai Superfight  || Zurich, Switzerland || TKO (Referee stoppage/Knees)|| 1 ||

|-  style="background:#cfc;"
| 2015-04-30 || Win ||align=left| Thomas Lelièvre || Road to Bangkok III || Cernier, Switzerland || Decision || 3 || 3:00

|-  style="background:#cfc;"
| 2015-04-11 || Win ||align=left| Zammim Ayubi || Warrior Challenge|| Zurich, Switzerland || Decision || 3 || 3:00

|- style="background:#cfc" 
| 2015-02- || Win ||align="left" |  ||  || Zurich, Switzerland ||  ||  ||

|- style="background:#cfc" 
| 2014-11-08 || Win ||align="left" | Valdrin Igrishta || Natthapong SUPER FIGHT NIGHT|| Zurich, Switzerland || Decision || 3 || 3:00

|-  style="background:#cfc;"
| 2014-09-06 || Win ||align=left| || Warrior Challenge|| Zurich, Switzerland || ||  ||

|- style="background:#cfc" 
| 2014-07-05 || Win ||align="left" | Pascal Locher || Thai Festival Bern 2014  || Bern, Switzerland || Decision || 3 || 3:00
|-
| colspan=9 | Legend:

References 

Swiss Muay Thai practitioners
Swiss people of Dominican Republic descent 
1998 births
Living people